Garry St. Jean (born February 10, 1950) is an American former professional basketball coach and executive.

St. Jean was head coach of the Sacramento Kings from 1992 through 1997. He later became the general manager of the Golden State Warriors, and in 1999–2000 he doubled as a head coach after P. J. Carlesimo was fired. St. Jean was a pro scout for the New Jersey Nets in the 2010–11 season. He has been an in-studio analyst for Golden State Warriors coverage on NBC Sports Bay Area since the start of the 2011-2012 season.

His son Greg St. Jean was hired as a player development coach with the Los Angeles Lakers for the 2019-20 season.

References

External links
 BasketballReference.com: Garry St. Jean
 HoopsHype.com General Managers: Garry St. Jean

1950 births
Living people
American men's basketball coaches
Basketball coaches from Massachusetts
Golden State Warriors assistant coaches
Golden State Warriors executives
Golden State Warriors head coaches
High school basketball coaches in the United States
Milwaukee Bucks assistant coaches
New Jersey Nets assistant coaches
People from Chicopee, Massachusetts
Sacramento Kings head coaches
Springfield College (Massachusetts) alumni